Jean Aubrey (1932-2008) was a British actress.

Jean Aubrey was born in Burton upon Trent, Staffordshire in 1932.

Selected filmography
 Date at Midnight as Paula Burroughs (1959)
 Model for Murder as Annabelle Meadows (1959)
 On the Fiddle as WAAF Corporal (1961)
 Man Detained (1961)
 On the Beat as Lady Hinchingford (1962)
 Do You Know This Voice? (1964) as Trudy

Selected television
 The Saint (1965)
 Theatre 625 (1967)

References

External links
 

1932 births
British stage actresses
British film actresses
British television actresses
20th-century British actresses
People from Burton upon Trent
2008 deaths